Jacques Parfait Cédric Mandjeck (born 8 April 1993), commonly known as Cédric Mandjeck, is a Cameroonian footballer who plays for Al-Rustaq SC in Oman Professional League.

Club career

Youth career
Born in Yaoundé, Cameroon, Cédric began his career as a footballer in 2008 with Fundación Privada Samuel Eto´o's football school in Barcelona, Spain. At the age of 15, he moved to Valencia where he began playing for Segunda División side, Levante UD's U-16 team. In 2010, he began playing for the U-17 side of CF Torre Levante. In 2012, he signed a one-year contract with Valencia CF and represented their U-18 and U-19 sides.

Valencia B
Impressed with his display for the junior squads, the club management decided to promote the Cameroonian midfielder to the Che's, Valencia CF Mestalla also known as Valencia B. He made his Segunda División B debut on 15 September 2013 in a 2-0 loss against CD Olímpic de Xàtiva as he came on as a late substitute for Alex Quintanilla.

On 8 October 2013, he made his first team debut, playing the entire second half in a 7–1 friendly win against Burjassot CF. He finished 2013–14 Segunda División B with 16 appearances and helped his side narrowly avoided relegation.

Veria
He then moved to Greece where on 3 September 2014, he signed a short-term contract with Superleague Greece side, Veria F.C. He made his club debut on 29 October 2014 in a 2-0 win over Ergotelis F.C. in the 2014–15 Greek Football Cup. He made his Superleague debut on 20 December 2014 in a 1-1 draw against Panthrakikos F.C.

Alzira
He moved back to Spain and more accurately to Alzira, Valencia where he signed a short-term contract with Tercera División side, UD Alzira. He finished with 8 appearances in the 2015–16 Tercera División.

Al-Rustaq
He moved to Oman and more accurately to Rustaq where on 11 September 2016, he signed a one-year contract with Oman Professional League side, Al-Rustaq SC. He made his Oman Professional League debut on 18 September 2016 in a 2-1 loss against Omani giants, Al-Oruba SC. He also made his Oman Professional League Cup debut on 11 November 2016 in a 5-4 penalty loss against Muscat Club in the First Round and his Sultan Qaboos Cup debut on 17 November 2016 in a 3-0 win over Al-Nahda Club.

Club career statistics

References

External links

Cédric Mandjeck - GOAL

Cédric Mandjeck - Superleague
Cédric Mandjeck - YouTube
Cédric Mandjeck - YouTube

1994 births
Living people
Footballers from Yaoundé
Cameroonian footballers
Association football midfielders
Segunda División B players
Tercera División players
Valencia CF Mestalla footballers
Veria F.C. players
CF Pobla de Mafumet footballers
Super League Greece players
Oman Professional League players
Cameroonian expatriate footballers
Cameroonian expatriate sportspeople in Spain
Expatriate footballers in Spain
Cameroonian expatriate sportspeople in Greece
Expatriate footballers in Greece
Cameroonian expatriate sportspeople in Oman
Expatriate footballers in Oman
CF Torre Levante players